n3D was an American 3DTV channel that launched on July 1, 2010. It was sponsored by Panasonic and available exclusively on DirecTV. It was the world's first 24-hour 3DTV channel.  Operations ceased June 25, 2012.

Programs
Programming that has aired includes TNT's broadcast of NASCAR's 2010 Coke Zero 400 on July 3; the local telecasts of the New York Yankees-Seattle Mariners series on July 10–11; and the 2010 Major League Baseball All-Star Game (in conjunction with Fox). Other shows include Guitar Center Sessions with artists Peter Gabriel and Jane's Addiction, plus such documentary fare as Dinosaurs: Giants of Patagonia, Wild Safari: A South African Adventure and N Wave Picture's S.O.S Planet, African Adventure: Safari in the Okavango, Encounter in the Third Dimension. Other new programming includes the new season of the History Channels series The Universe and the 2010 US Open Tennis Tournament. The channel will also show previously aired ESPN 3D events. On Christmas 2010 the channel aired The Prince's Trust Rock Gala 2010. On February 4, 2011, n3D premiered Formula Drift's "Round 7: Title Fight Event". On February 5, 2011, n3D aired the Fifth Annual Celebrity Beach Bowl. Since February 26, 2011, the channel has aired the new season of GSN's High Stakes Poker. Starting March 26, n3D aired Treasure Houses of Britain, in conjunction with WNET. A new show about surfing titled Gone Until December debuted in summer 2011.

References

Television channels and stations established in 2010
3D television channels
2010 establishments in the United States
Television channels and stations disestablished in 2012
DirecTV